Somitogenesis is the process by which somites form. Somites are bilaterally paired blocks of paraxial mesoderm that form along the anterior-posterior axis of the developing embryo in segmented animals. In vertebrates, somites give rise to skeletal muscle, cartilage, tendons, endothelium, and dermis.

Overview

In somitogenesis, somites form from the paraxial mesoderm, a particular region of mesoderm in the neurulating embryo. This tissue undergoes convergent extension as the primitive streak regresses, or as the embryo gastrulates. The notochord extends from the base of the head to the tail; with it extend thick bands of paraxial mesoderm.

As the primitive streak continues to regress, somites form from the paraxial mesoderm by "budding off" rostrally as somitomeres, or whorls of paraxial mesoderm cells, compact and separate into discrete bodies. The periodic nature of these splitting events has led many to say to that somitogenesis occurs via a clock-wavefront model, in which waves of developmental signals cause the periodic formation of new somites.

These immature somites then are compacted into an outer layer (the epithelium) and an inner mass (the mesenchyme).

The somites themselves are specified according to their location, as the segmental paraxial mesoderm from which they form it itself determined by position along the anterior-posterior axis before somitogenesis.

The cells within each somite are specified based on their location within the somite. In addition, they retain the ability to become any kind of somite-derived structure until relatively late in the process of somitogenesis.

Signaling

Periodicity

Once the cells of the pre-somitic mesoderm are in place following cell migration during gastrulation, oscillatory expression of many genes begins in these cells as if regulated by a developmental "clock." As mentioned previously, this has led many to conclude that somitogenesis is coordinated by a "clock and wave" mechanism.

In technical terms, this means that somitogenesis occurs due to the largely cell-autonomous oscillations of a network of genes and gene products, which causes cells to oscillate between a permissive and a non-permissive state in a consistently timed-fashion, like a clock. These genes include members of the FGF family, Wnt and Notch pathway, as well as targets of these pathways. The wavefront progress slowly in a posterior-to-anterior direction. As the wavefront of signaling comes in contact with cells in the permissive state, they undergo an epithelial-mesenchymal transition and pinch off from the more posterior pre-somitic mesoderm, forming a somite boundary and resetting the process for the next somite.

In particular, the cyclic activation of the Notch pathway appears to be of great importance in the wavefront-clock model. It has been suggested that the activation of Notch cyclically activates a cascade of genes necessary for the somites to separate from the main paraxial body. This is controlled by different means in different species, such as through a simple negative feedback loop in zebrafish or in a complicated process in which FGF and Wnt clocks affect the Notch clock, as in chicks and mice. However, the segmentation clock model is highly evolutionarily conserved.

Intrinsic expression of "clock genes" must oscillate with a periodicity equal to the time necessary for one somite to form, for example 30 minutes in zebrafish, 90 minutes in chicks, and 100 minutes in snakes.

Gene oscillation in presomitic cells is largely, but not completely, cell-autonomous. When Notch signaling is disrupted in zebrafish, neighboring cells no longer oscillate synchronously, indicating that Notch signaling is important for keeping neighboring populations of cells synchronous. In addition, some cellular inter-dependency has been displayed in studies concerning the protein Sonic hedgehog (Shh) in somitogenesis. Although expression of Shh pathway proteins has not been reported to oscillate in the pre-somitic mesoderm, they are expressed within the pre-somitic mesoderm during somitogenesis. When the notochord is ablated during somitogenesis in the chick embryo, the proper number of somites forms, but the segmentation clock is delayed for the posterior two-thirds of the somites. The anterior somites are not affected.  In one study, this phenotype was mimicked by Shh inhibitors, and timely somite formation was rescued by exogenous Shh protein, showing that the missing signal produced by the notochord is mediated by Shh.

Signaling in separation and epithelialization of somites

The physical separation of somites depends on the pulling of cells away from each other and the formation of borders and new adhesions between different cells. Studies indicate the importance of pathways involving Eph receptor and the Ephrin family of proteins, which coordinate border formation, in this process. Also, fibronectins and cadherins help the appropriate cells localize with each other.

Specification and differentiation

Regarding the paraxial mesoderm from which somites form, fate mapping experiments at the blastula stage show pre-somitic mesoderm progenitors at the site of gastrulation, referred to as the primitive streak in some organisms, in regions flanking the organizer. Transplant experiments show that only at the late gastrula stage are these cells committed to the paraxial fate, meaning that fate determination is tightly controlled by local signals and is not predetermined. For instance, exposure of pre-somitic mesoderm to Bone morphogenetic proteins (BMPs) ventralizes the tissue, however in vivo, BMP antagonists secreted by the organizer (such as Noggin and chordin) prevent this and thus promote the formation of dorsal structures.

Termination of somitogenesis

It is currently unknown by what particular mechanism somitogenesis is terminated. One proposed mechanism is massive cell death in the posteriormost cells of the paraxial mesoderm so that this region is prevented from forming somites. Others have suggested that the inhibition of BMP signaling by Noggin, a Wnt target gene, suppresses the epithelial-to-mesenchymal transition necessary for the splitting off of somites from the bands of pre-somitic mesoderm and thus terminates somitogenesis. Although endogenous retinoic acid is required in higher vertebrates to limit the caudal Fgf8 domain needed for somitogenesis in the trunk (but not tail), some studies also point to a possible role of retinoic acid in ending somitogenesis in vertebrates that lack a tail (human) or have a short tail (chick).  Other studies suggest termination may be due to an imbalance between the speed of somite formation and growth of the pre-somitic mesoderm extending into this tail region.

Somitogenesis in different species

Different species have different numbers of somites. For example, frogs have approximately 10, humans have 37, chicks have 50, mice have 65, and snakes have more than 300, up to about 500.

Somite number is unaffected by changes in the size of the embryo through experimental procedure. Because all developing embryos of a particular species form the same number of somites, the number of somites present is typically used as a reference for age in developing vertebrates.

References

Embryology